Sun Zhaoliang (born 28 May 1996) is a Chinese footballer who currently plays for Chinese club Lijiang Yuanheng.

Club career
Sun Zhaoliang went to Portugal for further training as a part of the Chinese Football Association's Project in 2011. He played for Pombal, Real Massamá and Sacavenense's youth academy between 2011 and 2015. Sun made his senior debut with Campeonato de Portugal club Pinhalnovense in the 2015–16 season. He moved to fellow Campeonato de Portuga side União Torreense in July 2016.

On 24 January 2017, Sun returned to China and signed a contract with his hometown club Liaoning F.C. in the Chinese Super League. He made his debut for Liaoning on 21 April 2017 in a 2–1 away defeat against Guangzhou Evergrande as the benefit of the new rule of the league that at least one Under-23 player must be in the starting line-up and was substituted off in the 18th minute. In January 2018, his former club Changchun Yatai submitted a claim to the Chinese Football Association for his ownership.

Career statistics 
Statistics accurate as of match played 31 December 2020.

References

External links
 

1996 births
Living people
Chinese footballers
Footballers from Shenyang
C.D. Pinhalnovense players
S.C.U. Torreense players
Liaoning F.C. players
Segunda Divisão players
Chinese Super League players
China League One players
Association football forwards
Chinese expatriate footballers
Expatriate footballers in Portugal
Chinese expatriate sportspeople in Portugal